Re is a village and comune in the Province of Verbano-Cusio-Ossola, in the region of Piedmont, Italy, approximately  from Domodossola and  from the border with Switzerland.  It is situated on the Domodossola-Locarno railway and is home to a pilgrimage church.

External links

Re centro di turismo religioso Re Religious Tourism Website

Cities and towns in Piedmont